The 1982 PBA Invitational Championship was a short tournament featuring the visiting South Korean squad and the top four teams of the Reinforced Filipino Conference. It started on July 25 and ended on August 10, 1982.

Format
The following format will be observed for the duration of the tournament:
 The top four teams of the 1982 PBA Reinforced Filipino Conference and a guest foreign team (Korea national basketball team) will compete for this conference.
 Single-round robin eliminations; 4 games per team; Teams are then seeded by basis on win–loss records.
 The top two teams after the round-robin will advance to the best-of-three finals series.

Elimination round

Third place playoffs

The Koreans were comfortably ahead by 21 points at halftime, 65–44, but were limited to only 14 points in the third quarter. They recovered in the final period and won by a safe margin despite losing four men on six fouls each.

South Korea clinch third place by outclassing Toyota in a game marred by a violent outburst that saw a provocative Korean and three Super Corollas thrown out midway in the last quarter. The Sokors led all the way and scored this conference's most points and biggest winning margin in the game. Toyota missed Francis Arnaiz, also in the sick list with Robert Jaworski.

Finals

Crispa came back from a 10-point deficit, 79–89, to lead 93–92, on a jumper by Atoy Co with 4:43 left in the game, but the Redmanizers did themselves in with passing errors, those turnovers set up back-to-back goals by Beerman Alex Tan, a side jumper by Marte Saldaña and Norman Black scored on another error by Ramon Cruz to give the Beermen a 100–93 lead, time down to 1:06 remaining. The Redmanizers absorbed their fifth loss to the Beermen and has yet to win over San Miguel in this season.

Crispa finally won a game against San Miguel this season and stay alive, tying the championship playoff at one game each. Beermen import Norman Black fouled out with a little more than two minutes left in the final quarter. The Redmanizers at one point, trailed by 14 points but the breaks of the game went their way, the Beermen failed to capitalize of free throws, they converted only 3 out of 10 tries in the last minutes of the ballgame.

The Beermen were down by nine points with 7:57 to go in the final period when an 11–2 run tied the count at 94-all. Norman Black, rookie Marte Saldaña and Manny Paner combined to give the Beermen a 103–98 edge with time down to 1:13 left. The Redmanizers threatened for the last time, 102–103, with 28 seconds remaining on two free throws by Atoy Co and Abet Guidaben, after Norman Black missed on a quartercourt jumper, Glenn Hagan gained possession but the Crispa import ran into a triple team and lost the ball, Hagan inbounded to Philip Cezar with three seconds left, Cezar muffed a short jumper, giving the title to San Miguel Beermen, which bag their second championship in the PBA.

References

External links
 PBA.ph

PBA Invitational Championship
Invitational Championship
PBA Invitational Championship